Yvette Marie Girouard (born 1954) is an American retired softball coach who was head coach at Southwestern Louisiana (later Louisiana) from 1981 to 2000 and LSU from 2001 to 2011.

On March 15, 2019 at the Louisiana softball game vs. the Troy Trojans, Lamson Park was rededicated to Yvette Girouard. The park is now known as “Yvette Girouard Field at Lamson Park.”

Early life and education
Born in Broussard, Louisiana, Girouard grew up in nearby Lafayette and graduated from Ovey Comeaux High School in 1972. She attended the University of Southwestern Louisiana (now the University of Louisiana at Lafayette). A member of the volleyball team from 1972 to 1975, Girouard graduated in 1976 with a B.S. in health and physical education.

Coaching career
Girouard began the softball program at Lafayette High School in 1977. After three seasons at Lafayette High, Girouard was head coach at her alma mater Comeaux High in 1980 before starting the softball program at Southwestern Louisiana in 1981.

As head coach at Southwestern Louisiana Girouard had an overall 759-250 record from 1981 to 2000. Her teams advanced to 10 NCAA Tournaments, including three Women's College World Series, finishing third in 1993 and fifth in 1995 and 1996.

Girouard left the Ragin Cajuns in 2001 to take the reins of the LSU program. She finished her career at LSU with a 526-171-1 record. She led LSU to two Women's College World Series (third-place finishes in 2001 and 2004), three SEC championships (2001, 2002, and 2004), four SEC tournament championships (2001, 2002, 2004, and 2007), and two SEC tournament runner-up finishes (2003 and 2006).  Her LSU teams played in seven NCAA tournaments.

Girouard is one of only three coaches to take two teams to the Women's College World Series.  She was the National Fastpitch Coaches Association National Coach of the Year in 1990 and 1993; the Southland Conference Coach of the Year in 1984, 1985, and 1987; the Sun Belt Conference Coach of the Year in 2000; and the Southeastern Conference Coach of the Year in 2001, 2002, and 2006.  She is also a 13-time winner of Louisiana Coach of the Year. Between her stints at Louisiana-Lafayette and LSU, her career record is 1,285-421-1.

Girouard was succeeded by former Louisiana head coach Michael Lotief
and current LSU head coach Beth Torina.

Girouard was inducted into the National Fastpitch Coaches Association Hall of Fame in December 2005 and the Louisiana Softball Coaches Association Hall of Fame in June 2002.

Head coaching record
Source for Southwestern Louisiana/Louisiana–Lafayette:

Source for LSU:

See also
National Fastpitch Coaches Association Hall of Fame
List of college softball coaches with 1,000 wins

References

1954 births
LSU Tigers softball coaches
Living people
Sportspeople from Lafayette, Louisiana
Louisiana Ragin' Cajuns softball coaches
Louisiana Ragin' Cajuns athletes
Louisiana Ragin' Cajuns women's volleyball
People from Broussard, Louisiana
American women's volleyball players
American softball coaches
21st-century American women